Stanisław Pagaczewski (1916-1984) was a Polish journalist and writer, best known for children literature, including the trilogy about Baltazar Gąbka.

References

Short bio on publisher page
Stanisław Pagaczewski (1916 – 1984) – autor Przygód Profesora Gąbki – Jego Kraków i Góry Harów

1916 births
1984 deaths
Burials at Rakowicki Cemetery
Polish children's writers
Recipient of the Meritorious Activist of Culture badge